Dorymyrmex tuberosus is a species of ant in the genus Dorymyrmex. Described by Cuezzo and Guerrero in 2011, the species is endemic to Colombia.

References

Dorymyrmex
Hymenoptera of South America
Insects described in 2011